Simontornya is a town in Tolna County, Hungary.

See also 
 Simontornya Castle

External links 

 Simontornya's info page
 Street map

References

Populated places in Tolna County